was a Japanese  imperial princess of the early Heian period.

Biography 
Ito's exact date of birth is unknown. Her father was Emperor Kanmu. She became the wife of Prince Abo, and the mother of the waka poets Ariwara no Yukihira and Narihira.

The Kōfuku-ji in Nara houses a document, the Ito-naishinnō Ganmon, which records her donation of incense and sutras to the temple, and is dated to 833.

She died in Kyoto, in 861.

Family tree

References

Bibliography

External links 
Ito-naishinnō on Kotobank.

861 deaths
9th-century Japanese people
9th-century Japanese women
Ito
People of Heian-period Japan
Daughters of emperors